The 105 mm Howitzer M3 was a U.S. light howitzer designed for use by airborne troops. The gun utilized the barrel of the 105 mm Howitzer M2, shortened and fitted to a slightly modified split trail carriage of the 75 mm pack howitzer.

The howitzer was used by the U.S. Army during World War II. It was issued to airborne units and the cannon companies of infantry regiments.

Development and production
The process of building airborne forces in 1941 led to a requirement for an air-portable 105 mm howitzer. A prototype reached trials at Aberdeen Proving Ground in March 1942.

The howitzer was designed to fire the same ammunition as the M2 howitzer, however, it was found that the shorter barrel resulted in incomplete burning of the propelling charge. The problem could be solved by use of faster-burning powder, and otherwise, the design was considered acceptable and was standardized as the 105 mm Howitzer M3 on Carriage M3. The carriage was soon succeeded by the M3A1, which had trails made from thicker steel plate. Even stronger tubular trails were designed, but never reached production.

Production started in February 1943 and continued until May 1944; an additional batch was produced from April to June 1945.

Service

Even though the M3 was not mentioned in the February 1944 T/O&E, shortly before the Normandy airdrops some airborne divisions received a 105 mm glider field artillery battalion equipped with them as a supplement to their existing three 75 mm howitzer battalions (designated the M1A1 during World War II). 1/4 ton jeeps were used as prime movers. Later increased to four battalions, one, between 1943 and 1945, was converted to 105mm M3. The weapon was finally authorized as an option by the December 1944 TO&E, and by 1945 was employed by all airborne divisions in the European Theater.

The initial production of the M3 was adequate to equip the cannon companies of the three hundred infantry regiments that had been forecast in the initial war plans. The M3 was the primary weapon of these companies, and appeared in the table of organization and equipment (T/O&E) from early 1944 (six, in three platoons of two) Often the cannon companies were integrated into the division artillery. The infantry used 1½ ton cargo trucks as the prime mover. In an assessment written after the war "The cannon company of 1943-45 failed to live up to the expectations of the force designers of 1942. The main problem was the substitution of towed low-velocity howitzers for the self-propelled versions as originally intended.

A small number of M3s were supplied via lend lease channels to France (94), United Kingdom (2) and countries of Latin America (18). They were used early in the Korean War as ROK divisional artillery.

Operators
  
  
 
  
  
 
 : The Armed Forces received 98 M3s from the U.S. in 1948.
 : 11 in 1953

Variants

Gun variants:
T7, standardized as M3.
T10 - variant with elevation increased to 65 degrees.

Carriage variants:
M3 - based on M3A1 carriage for the 75 mm field howitzer.
M3A2 - was fitted with shield.

Self-propelled mounts
There were two proposals for a self-propelled artillery piece armed with the M3. Neither reached mass production.

105 mm Howitzer Motor Carriage T38 - based on the M3 halftrack, never built.
105 mm Howitzer Motor Carriage T82 (M3 in mount M3A1) - based on the Light Tank M5A1 chassis. Two pilots were built. The project was cancelled in June 1945 due to lack of requirement.

Ammunition
The gun fired semi-fixed ammunition, similar to the ammunition of the M2; it used the same projectiles and the same 105 mm Cartridge Case M14, but with different propelling charge. The latter used faster burning powder to avoid incomplete burning; it consisted of a base charge and four increments, forming five charges from 1 (the smallest) to 5 (the largest). In an emergency, gunners were authorized to fire M1 HE rounds prepared for the Howitzer M2, but only with charges from 1 to 3. M1 HE rounds for the M3 could be fired from an M2 with any charge.

HEAT M67 Shell had non-adjustable propelling charge. For blank ammunition, a shorter Cartridge Case M15 with black powder charge was used.

See also
 OTO Melara Mod 56 - Similar mountain gun developed for the Italian Army

Notes

References

World War II artillery of the United States
Cold War artillery of the United States
World War II field artillery
105 mm artillery
Weapons and ammunition introduced in 1943